Horace Osborne Robotham (12 June 1879 – 12 September 1916) was an English professional footballer who played in the Football League for Glossop and Wolverhampton Wanderers as a right half. He also played in the Southern League for Fulham, New Brompton and Brentford.

Personal life 
On 26 November 1915, in Wolverhampton during the First World War, Robotham enlisted in the 23rd (Service) Battalion of the Middlesex Regiment. He served his initial time on the Western Front between Hazebrouck and Bailleul in 1916 and later took part in the Battle of the Somme. Robotham was killed on 12 September 1916 during the Battle of Flers-Courcelette. His body was never recovered and his name is recorded on the Thiepval Memorial to the Missing of the Somme.

Career statistics

References

1879 births
1916 deaths
footballers from Wolverhampton
English footballers
Association football wing halves
Hunslet F.C. (association football) players
Wolverhampton Wanderers F.C. players
Fulham F.C. players
Brentford F.C. players
Glossop North End A.F.C. players
Gillingham F.C. players
Military personnel from Staffordshire
Telford United F.C. players
English Football League players
Southern Football League players
Middlesex Regiment soldiers
British Army personnel of World War I
British military personnel killed in the Battle of the Somme